Erastus Rudd Harper (July 14, 1854 – May 12, 1927) was the 16th Lieutenant Governor of Colorado, serving from 1907 to 1909 under Henry Augustus Buchtel.

References

Lieutenant Governors of Colorado
1854 births
1927 deaths